Vissel (also Visselbach) is a stream in Lower Saxony, Germany, on the Lüneburg Heath. The Vissel rises at Visselhövede and flows into the Rodau southwest of Bothel.

See also
 List of rivers of Lower Saxony

References

Rivers of Lower Saxony
Lüneburg Heath
Rivers of Germany